I Look to You is the seventh and final studio album by American singer Whitney Houston. It was first released on August 28, 2009, through Sony Music in Europe, then August 31, 2009 with Arista Records in the United States before being released by RCA Records in the United Kingdom on October 19, 2009. The album was Houston's first non-holiday studio album since 2002's Just Whitney. It received favorable reviews from music critics, based on an aggregate score of 66/100 from Metacritic and debuted on the US Billboard 200 at number one with sales of 305,000 beating her previous career best first-week sale of 205,137 units with Just Whitney (2002), and it was her first album to reach number one in the US since 1992's The Bodyguard. Additionally it became her fourth chart-topping album, thus extending her as the female artist with the most cumulative weeks at the number one position.

It has spawned two official singles: The title song, which became a top 20 US R&B chart single, and the international single "Million Dollar Bill", which hit the top ten in several countries worldwide and also becoming a US top 20 R&B hit. Since its release, I Look to You has gone on to sell over 2.5 million copies worldwide, earning platinum certification in seven countries and gold certification in eight. A promotional single, "Nothin' But Love", taken from the album, was only released to UK radio stations to promote the accompanying Nothing but Love World Tour. Houston died on February 11, 2012, making this her last living studio release.

Background
I Look to You had first been conceived in 2007 with recording and production taking place in 2008, as said Houston during her Los Angeles album listening party in 2009. Rumor of Houston's return to music were first circulated at the start of 2007 and were then substantiated when record label boss and close mentor Clive Davis confirmed that he would personally be involved in the project whilst speaking on The Oprah Winfrey Show. In February 2009, Houston appeared on stage at Davis's "Pre-Grammy Gala" where she performed a four-song set comprising "I Will Always Love You", "I Believe in You and Me", "It's Not Right but It's Okay", and a rousing version of "I'm Every Woman". Onlookers included her mother Cissy Houston, musicians Paul McCartney, Jamie Foxx, and Barry Manilow as well as actors Antonio Banderas and Sylvester Stallone.

She told press in London that her latest album will reflect her emotional state and chronicle events in her personal life since her last musical release in 2002. She said "That makes it real. The changes that we go through, the transitions that we go through, the tests that we go through, being a mother, becoming a single mother. It all had its ups and its downs, but for the most part, I kept my faith and I kept my head up... I took my time. All the triumphs and the ups and downs and stuff, it's all incorporated on the album, and hopefully not only does it inspire me, but inspires a whole lot of other people."

Music

According to Davis, I Look to You was not aimed at simply following current music marketing trends, but instead, staying true to who Houston is and the impact she has made on the music industry. The album's opener "Million Dollar Bill" was written and co-produced by Alicia Keys, after the singer-songwriter personally asked Davis if she could make a contribution to the album. Houston had previously asked Keys to write/produce a song for her. The song's beat produced by Swizz Beatz surprised critics, as they felt it was more of an "old-school R&B" production and did not sound like most "Swizzy" productions, and is "not an attempt at being a hip-hop club banger." Shaheem Reed from MTV commented "Houston's voice [was displayed] over a club-friendly beat that blends a rough-riding thump with R&B". "Nothin' But Love", produced by contemporary R&B and hip-hop producer Nathaniel "Danja" Hills, was described by Rap-Up magazine as being "uptempo [and] danceable [with a] hand-clapping beat." It was also described as being made for urban radio.  "Call You Tonight" is one of two songs written by Johntá Austin and was produced by Norwegian production team Stargate featuring "their trademark guitar riffs". The other Austin track on the album is a mid-tempo R&B track titled, "Worth It", produced by Eric Hudson.

In the Summer 2009 edition of Rap-Up, R&B singer Akon spoke about working with Houston for the then-upcoming album. In the interview he revealed that he had worked with her on two songs for the album; one of which, "Like I Never Left", was previously leaked to the internet. It had initially been tipped as a single. Davis said Houston wanted an island song, so they reached out to Akon. The song was likened to Janet Jackson's "My Baby", which featured Kanye West. American singer R. Kelly also wrote two songs for the album. One of the songs "Salute" was described as being "militaristic [with a] marching beat" that also features Kelly on the backing vocals in the chorus. In the song Houston makes reference to LL Cool J with the lyric, "Don't call it a comeback, I've been here for years." Kelly's other contribution, "I Look to You" became the album's title song, and was released as the album's debut single. When speaking of the piano ballad Houston said, "It sums up all I wanted to say." The album also contains a cover of the 1970s Leon Russell song, "A Song for You". Houston's cover begins with a slow piano intro, which picks up in the middle.

Following the popularity of the dance remix B-sides appearing on the UK CD release of "Million Dollar Bill", a number of remix EPs were released. "I Look to You – The Remixes" was released on November 6, 2009, in the US and UK, featuring 12 dance remixes of the first single "I Look to You". Also released in the UK and US. on November 6, 2009, was "The Remixes", featuring remixes of "I Look to You", "I Didn't Know My Own Strength", and "Million Dollar Bill". This was followed by the final remix EP being released on November 6, 2009, called "I Didn't Know My Own Strength Remixes", which was released in the US and UK.

Release
On July 14, 2009, Houston travelled to Knightsbridge in London, England, for an official album listening party. The evening was hosted at the Mandarin Oriental Hotel by Sony Music chief creative executive Clive Davis. In total nine songs were premiered including "Million Dollar Bill", "Nothin' But Love", "I Didn't Know My Own Strength", "Like I Never Left" (featuring Akon), "For the Lovers", "I Look to You", "Worth It", and a cover of Leon Russell's "A Song for You". "Call You Tonight" (produced by Johntá Austin) was also played and cited as a likely lead single. Davis pointed out that, "We didn't try to fit Whitney into the market." On July 21, 2009, Houston hosted a listening party with Davis in New York City. Amongst those in attendance were Alicia Keys, Diane Sawyer, Martha Stewart and Vivica A. Fox. The album preview triggered a standing ovation, and the song Million Dollar Bill was among those that received critical acclaim. Finally on July 23, 2009, at the Beverly Hilton Hotel in Beverly Hills, California, the final star-studded listening party took place that was attended by musical and Hollywood elites. Some of the attendees included Halle Berry, Jane Fonda, Stevie Wonder, Magic Johnson, Jackie Collins, Barry Manilow, Beverly Johnson, Diane Warren, Penny Marshall, Brian McKnight, and David Foster amongst others. Again the album was played almost in its entirety, receiving a standing ovation.

Critical reception

Critical response to I Look to You was generally positive with aggregated reviews on Metacritic awarding the album, 66/100. Most reviews praised the selection of songs and Houston's delivery. Digital Spy noted Houston's voice has changed, becoming deeper and huskier. Ann Powers in her LA Times review said, "Certain voices stand like monuments upon the landscape of 20th century pop, defining the architecture of their times, sheltering the dreams of millions and inspiring the climbing careers of countless imitators. Whitney Houston owns one of those voices." People magazine gave it three out of four stars, saying "Come Grammy night, Houston will leave just as she came." Slant Magazine critic Sal Cinquemani also wrote I Look to You finds Whitney struggling to hit notes and deliver phrases that should come effortlessly to such a seasoned vocalist; her vocal cords are plagued by edema, her voice reedy and lacking the crystalline clarity it once possessed on classics like "I Will Always Love You" and "I Have Nothing".

Although critical of Houston's voice, Cinquemani also noted how her vocal change benefited the album: "[Houston] sounds alive, and seemingly happy to be. [...] The New Voice lives more contently in the midtempo numbers that allow her to sink into the grooves. [...] For the most part, I Look to You manages to sound completely contemporary without the use of guest rappers, dumbed-down lyrics, or slang." Likewise, Leah Greenblatt of Entertainment Weekly, who gave the album a torn B− rating, felt that Houston's huskier vocals lent an emotional intensity to the album: “Houston’s famous voice, which now sounds husky and glottal, as if her vocal cords were sent through a washer-dryer cycle with a handful of small rocks, brings a gravity that the album’s often generically worded ballads lack.” However, the critic criticized the album for its lack of insight on her struggles of the past years, writing "listeners may feel shut out of the fight. Whatever hardship she's endured, the battles within remain a mystery."

AllMusic gave I Look to You three stars (out of five) commenting about Houston's problems in the past, her voice and her talent: "I Look to You attempts to wash this all away with something of a return to roots—a celebration of Houston's deep disco beginnings, tempered with a few skyscraping ballads designed to showcase her soaring voice. Houston's rocky decade isn't ignored, but it isn't explored, either: songs allude to Whitney's strength, her willpower as a survivor struggling through some unnamed struggle — enough for listeners to fill in the blanks, either with their own experience or their imaginings of Houston's life. [...] at the very least, Whitney can still sing, knowing when to wring emotion out of a phrase, knowing when not to push for the glory notes that she can no longer hit. [...] What she undoubtedly is, is a pro – she sells these subdued glitzy productions, she makes boring songs interesting, she remains a forceful, tangible presence."

Nick Levine of Digital Spy gave the album 4 out of 5 stars and said, "Thanks to contributions from a clutch of au courant R&B producers, it does sound contemporary...her voice may not be as technically impressive as it was, but its new, more weathered tones have character, making an optimistic song like Million Dollar Bill really quite touching and a defiant one like 'For The Lovers' more dramatic. If a little too steady to be called a classic, I Look To You is certainly an accomplished, enjoyable return—don't call it a comeback—from an artist who sounds keen again, a lioness who's rediscovered her pride."

Commercial performance
I Look to You debuted at number one on the US Billboard 200 with sales of 305,000 copies, easily beating pre-release expectations of 250,000 to 270,000 and representing Houston's best opening week sales during the Nielsen SoundScan era. The album is Houston's fourth number one album overall – her first number one album since The Bodyguard (1992) and her first number one debut since Whitney (1987). The album also debuted at number one on the US R&B/Hip-Hop Albums chart and the US Digital Albums chart.  

Sales spiked with Houston's high-profile appearance on The Oprah Winfrey Show on September 14-15, 2009, returning the album to the number two position in its third week of release with 156,000 copies sold. I Look to You spent a total of 39 weeks on the US Billboard 200, including four weeks in the top ten. On December 1, 2009, the album was certified platinum by the RIAA for shipping one million copies, finishing the year as the 29th biggest selling album of 2009 in the United States and ranking Houston among the top ten female artists in the US Billboard 200. Additionally, I Look to You was the 9th best selling US R&B/Hip-Hop album of 2009, having spent 11 weeks in the top ten for the R&B chart.

Internationally, I Look to You debuted at number one in Canada (30,000 copies), Germany, Italy, The Netherlands, Poland, and Switzerland, and at number three in the UK (51,632 copies), France (19,000 copies), and Spain. In Korea the album reached number one on the monthly chart and sold 12,429 copies. According to Houston's official website, the album and singles combined have sold a total of 500,000 copies in the UK and Ireland.  The 2.5 million copies sold worldwide for I Look to You made it the 19th biggest selling album globally in 2009, outperforming other high profile albums released that year, such as Miley Cyrus' Hannah Montana movie soundtrack (2.46 million), Jay-Z's The Blueprint 3 (2.4 million), John Mayer's Battle Studies (2.28 million), and Madonna's Celebration compilation album (2.26 million).

Singles
The album was preceded by the release of the title song, "I Look to You" which was written by R. Kelly and produced by Tricky Stewart, Harvey Mason Jr., and Emanuel Kiriakou. The song was serviced in the US as the lead single and later as the second international single. It peaked in the top 20 of the US Hot R&B/Hip-Hop Songs chart, number 70 on the Billboard Hot 100 and the top 30 of the Gospel chart. Internationally the song had mixed success, peaking as high as number 16 in Switzerland and as low as 115 in the United Kingdom.

The album's second US single (first single internationally) was "Million Dollar Bill", written and produced by Alicia Keys and Swizz Beatz. It peaked at 100 on the Billboard Hot 100 and in the top 20 on the R&B/Hip-Hop chart. Additionally it topped the Hot Dance Club Songs and the Adult R&B Songs charts. Internationally the single experienced some success, including in the United Kingdom where promotion of the Freemasons remix enabled it to peak at number five, her first top 5 hit in a decade.

Other charted songs
The ballad, "I Didn't Know My Own Strength", written by Diane Warren and produced by David Foster, peaked at number 17 on the US Hot Dance Club Songs chart after a remix was released as a bonus track on the US iTunes version of the album. Later, following Houston's performance on The Oprah Winfrey Show, it appeared at number 61 on the US Hot R&B/Hip-Hop Songs chart. Internationally the song peaked at number 38 and number 44 in Ireland and the United Kingdom respectively following its performance by Danyl Johnson, one of the finalists on the sixth series of The X Factor. It also charted on the Japan Hot 100 at number 16.

Another song, "Nothin' But Love" was sent to UK radio stations as a promotional single to coincide with the Nothing But Love World Tour. It reached the A-list on BBC Radio 2. Digital Spy gave the song a positive review and awarded it 5/5. and called it a "modern Whitney classic". Meanwhile, "Worth It" debuted on the Korean International Singles Chart at number 182 before eventually peaking at number 56 and number 61 on US Hot R&B/Hip Hop Songs chart.

Promotion and appearances

Tour

Houston's performance on Good Morning America's 'Fall Concerts' series on the American television broadcast network ABC aired on September 2, 2009. She performed songs from the album, including single "Million Dollar Bill" and title song "I Look to You", as well as previous hits "I'm Every Woman" and "My Love Is Your Love". It was also announced at the start of September that Houston would be interviewed by Oprah Winfrey for the new season of The Oprah Winfrey Show and perform "I Didn't Know My Own Strength" as personally requested by Winfrey. The Winfrey interview turned into two one-hour specials featuring the most in-depth and personal interviews of both Houston's and Winfrey's careers and were screened on September 14 and 15 featuring the promised live performance of "I Didn't Know My Own Strength". Winfrey called it the best interview she has ever done. 

On October 3, 2009, Houston appeared on German television show, Wetten Dass, and later she was on Le Grand Journal in France to perform "Million Dollar Bill". On October 18, Houston performed the same song live on The X Factor, marking her first UK performance in over a decade. She also performed the single live on The X Factor in Italy. On November 22, 2009, Houston performed "I Didn't Know My Own Strength" at the 2009 American Music Awards in Los Angeles, which gave her a standing ovation.

It was announced via Houston's official website on October 12, 2009, that the singer would embark on her first world tour in 11 years in promotion of her latest album I Look to You. "This is my first full tour since the My Love Is Your Love tour and I am so excited to be performing for my fans around the world after all this time. I am putting together a great show and cannot wait to perform the songs from my new album I Look To You along with some of your favourites."
The tour began on December 9, 2009, in Russia with further dates including Germany, Switzerland, Austria, Belgium, Italy, and Australia.

Track listing

Notes
"Million Dollar Bill" contains a sample from "We're Getting Stronger", written by Allan Felder, Norman Harris and Ronald Tyson, as performed by Loleatta Holloway.
"A Song for You" is a cover of the original song by Leon Russell.
 also a vocal producer
 vocal producer
 co-producer
Unless noted otherwise or not credited, all vocal production handled by Harvey Mason, Jr.

Personnel and credits

Personnel

Marcella "Ms. Lago" Araica – mixing
Christian Baker – assistant
Adam Beyrer – additional instrument recording engineer (track 2)
Courtney Blooding – background vocals
Anita Marisa Boriboon – art direction and design
Clive Davis – executive producer, A&R
Michael Daley – assistant vocal engineer
Kaseem "Swizz Beatz" Dean – music producer, music programming (track 1)
Patrick Demarchelier – photography
Mikkel S. Eriksen – recording engineer (track 3), instrumentation (3, 6), producer (3, 6)
Abel Garibaldi – instrumental recording engineer (track 11)
Fernando Garibay – music producer (track 2)
Chris Gehringer – mastering
Charlotte Gibson – background vocals (track 8)
Angela N. Golightly – production coordination
Christy Hall – production assistant
Andrew Hey – audio mixing (track 11), vocal recording engineer (2, 4–6, 8–9, 11)
Gary Houston – background vocals (track 8)
Whitney Houston – lead vocals (All tracks), executive producer, songwriter (5, 10)
Dabling Harward – vocal engineer
Eric Hudson – music producer, all instruments (track 8)
Tavia Ivey – background vocals (tracks 2, 8)
Larry Eaglin Jackson – executive producer, A&R
Chad Jolley – instrumental recording engineer (track 9)
Claude Kelly – vocal producer
Robert Kelly (R. Kelly) – music arranger, producer (track 11)
Alicia Keys – vocal producer, vocal arrangement, music producer (track 1)
Emanuel Kiriakou – producer, all other instruments (track 4)
Damien Lewis – engineer
Donnie Lyle – guitar, musical direction
Tony Maserati – mixing
Harvey Mason Jr. – producer (track 4), mixing (11), vocal producer (2, 5–6, 8, 11)
Kenny Mason – choir director (track 4)
Jeff Meeks – instrumental recording engineer (track 11)
Jan Fairchild – engineer
Nick Fainbarg – engineer
Ian Mereness – instrumental recording engineer (track 11)
Ann Mincieli – recording engineer (track 1)
Luis Navarro – assistant
Dave Pensado – mixing
Jochem van der Saag – synthesizer, recording engineer, drum machine, audio mixing, sound design (track 7)
Miguel Scott – assistant
Timothy Snell – stylist
Bernt Rune Stray – guitar
Phil Tan – mixing
Aliaune "Akon" Thiam – music producer (tracks 5, 10), vocals (5)
Pat Thrall – instrumental recording engineer (track 4)
Miki Tsutsumi – assistant
Giorgio Tuinfort – co-producer, additional music programming (tracks 5, 10)

Recording locations and studios

Atlanta (Konkast, Patchwerk, Soapbox)
Burbank (Boom Boom Room)
Chicago (Chocolate Factory)
Hollywood (Record Plant)
Las Vegas (Studio at the Palms)
Los Angeles (1221, Blue, Chalice Recording
Miami (Hit Factory Criteria)
New York (Chun King, Germano, KMA, OVEN, Roc the Mic, Sterling Sound)
Norcross (Tree Sound)
North Hollywood (Larrabee Sound, Mason Sound)
San Francisco (Soapbox West)

Charts

Weekly charts

Year-end charts

Certifications and sales

Accolades

American Music Awards

|-
|  style="width:35px; text-align:center;"|2009 || Whitney Houston (herself) || International Artist Award || 
|}
The 'International Artist Award' was given "in recognition of her worldwide success exemplified by her international record sales, radio airplay in countries all over the world, live performances that span the globe, and popularity that knows no borders or boundaries."

Soul Train Music Awards

|-
|  style="width:35px; text-align:center;" |2009 || Whitney Houston (herself) || Best R&B/Soul Artist — Female || 
|-

The BET Honors

|-
|  style="width:35px; text-align:center;" |2010 || Whitney Houston (herself) || The BET Honor for Entertainment || 
|-

NAACP Image Awards

|-
|  style="width:35px; text-align:center;" rowspan="2"|2010 || Whitney Houston (herself) || Outstanding Female Artist || 
|-
| "I Look to You" || Outstanding Music Video || 
|-
|  style="width:35px; text-align:center;" |2013 || "I Look to You" || Outstanding Best Song || 
|-

Echo Awards

|-
|  style="width:35px; text-align:center;" |2010 || Whitney Houston (herself) || Künstlerin International Rock/Pop (Best International Rock/Pop Artist ― Female) || 
|-
|}

Release history

References

External links
 I Look to You at Metacritic

2009 albums
Arista Records albums
Whitney Houston albums
Albums produced by Akon
Albums produced by Clive Davis
Albums produced by Danja (record producer)
Albums produced by David Foster
Albums produced by Eric Hudson
Albums produced by R. Kelly
Albums produced by Alicia Keys
Albums produced by Swizz Beatz
Albums produced by Stargate
Albums produced by Tricky Stewart
Albums produced by Fernando Garibay
Albums produced by Whitney Houston